Ankaraobato is a rural municipality in Analamanga Region, in the  Central Highlands of Madagascar. It belongs to the district of Antananarivo-Atsimondrano and its populations numbers to 20,969 in 2019. 

It is localized at 8 km from the capital Antananarivo on the National road 7 and is limited by the river Sisaony in the East.

References

Populated places in Analamanga